Mycielski (singular masculine), Mycielska (singular feminine), Mycielscy (plural) are from a Polish noble family. The Hrabia (Count) Dołęga-Mycielscy were originally from the clan Dołęga in the Mazowieckie region of Poland.

Family
 Anna Luiza Mycielska (1729-1771)
 Ignacy Mycielski (1842-1884) 
 Ludwik Mycielski (1854-1926)
 Kazimierz Mycielski (1904-1980)
 Zygmunt Mycielski (1907-1987)
 Jan Mycielski (1932-)
Maciej Mycielki (1940-)
 Michael Mycielski (1982-)

Sources
 Ruvigny, Marquis of, The Titled Nobility of Europe, 1914, p. 1065.
 Staszewski Janusz: Gen. Michał Mycielski i udział rodziny Mycielskich w powstaniu listopadowem, Poznań 1930; 
 Stańczyk: Szlachectwo zobowiązuje (3) w: Wiadomości Wrzesińskie z 5.09.2008
 Stanisław Karwowski: Wolsztyn i jego dziedzice, Poznań 1911, s. 62; 
 Magdalena Bajer: Mycielscy: Osiągnięcia naukowe i kariery akademickie nie były dla nich powodem rozstania się z tradycjami światłej części warstwy ziemiańskiej w: Rody uczone (56), Forum Akademickie-Portal środowiska akademickiego i naukowego